Gibraltar Peak is a mountain with an elevation of   that is located within the Tidbinbilla Nature Reserve, approximately  from Canberra, in the Australian Capital Territory. Gibraltar Peak is the 45th highest mountain in the Australian Capital Territory. There are two tracks leading up to the summit of the mountain, the longer being  and the shorter being .

Location and features
The nearest point of road access to the summit is an unsealed road  from the summit. The peak is located inside the Tidbinbilla Nature Reserve.

Vegetation and wildlife
Eastern grey kangaroos live on the peak.

Hiking routes and activity
There are two tracks leading up to the summit of Gibraltar Peak, one is an  return walk from the Dalsetta car park; the other is  return journey via the Birrigai Time Trail and the visitor centre. The track leading up to the peak was created by Makin Trax, that won an award for its work in 2012. Within two weeks of the new track being opened in May 2012, over 400 people had used it. A viewing platform was built near the mountain.

Organised bushwalks have been done at the peak.

People have illegally dumped garbage near the peak. During the 1970s, Australian climbers including Bryden Allen, Joe Friend, John Fantini and Keith Bell were climbing Gibraltar Peak and other mountains in the area. During the 1980s, Antipodean Atrocities was created at the peak as a climbing route up the mountain.

References

External links

 Explore Canberra: Gibraltar Peak walking trail, abc.net.au (includes video)

Mountains of the Australian Capital Territory